Miles is an unincorporated community in Pendleton County, West Virginia, United States. Miles is located along County Route 3 in the George Washington National Forest.

References

Unincorporated communities in Pendleton County, West Virginia
Unincorporated communities in West Virginia